The Central Bank of Samoa, situated in the capital Apia beside the main government buildings, issues the Samoan currency, the Samoan tālā as well as regulates and manages the exchange rate with foreign currencies. In its role as the central bank for the government and the country, it is also responsible for the registration and supervision of commercial banks. The current governor since 2011 has been Maiava Atalina Emma Ainuu-Enari.

Legally, the bank follows a mandate pursuant to the Central Bank of Samoa Act 1984, the Financial Institutions Act 1996 and the Money Laundering Prevention Act 2000. The Central Bank of Samoa was preceded by Monetary Board established in 1975.

The bank is engaged in developing policies to promote financial inclusion and is a member of the Alliance for Financial Inclusion. The institution made a Maya Declaration Commitment in 2013 with an intent to build an inclusive financial system in Samoa that serves all members of society.

Its official name in the Samoan language, Faletupe Tutotonu o Samoa, means 'Central Bank (lit. Central Money House) of Samoa'.

Head office
The head office for the bank is situated in the capital Apia, near the government buildings and by a historic clock tower.

Governors
Bill Davies, Australian, 1984-1987
John A. Howard, Briton, 1987-1989
Leasi Papali'i Tommy Scanlan, 1989-2011
Atalina Ainuu-Enari, 2011-

See also
Economy of Samoa

References

External links
Official site: Central Bank of Samoa

Samoa
Banks of Samoa
Economy of Samoa
1984 establishments in Samoa
Banks established in 1984
Government-owned companies of Samoa